"I Wish" is a song written and performed by American rapper Skee-Lo. It was released on April 10, 1995, via Scotti Brothers Records as the lead single from the rapper's debut studio album of the same name (1995). Recording sessions took place at Sunshine Studios in Hollywood, California. Production was handled by Walter "Kandor" Kahn and Skee-Lo himself.

In the United States, the single peaked at number 13 on the Billboard Hot 100 and was certified Gold by the Recording Industry Association of America for selling 600,000 copies domestically. Internationally, the song reached number 4 in Sweden and Norway, number 5 in Finland, number 6 in the Netherlands, number 10 in Switzerland, number 14 in Germany and New Zealand, number 15 in the UK, and made it to the Top 25 in Belgium and France.

Most of the song's instruments are sampled from "Spinnin'" by Bernard Wright, and the song features a vocal sample of people shouting from the track "Buffalo Gals" by Malcolm McLaren.

The song was nominated for Grammy Award for Best Rap Solo Performance at the 38th Annual Grammy Awards but lost to Coolio's "Gangsta's Paradise". Blender listed "I Wish" as number 359 on its list of "500 Greatest Songs Since You Were Born".

Overview

The song's lyrics are self-deprecating, with Skee-Lo lamenting a variety of personal shortcomings that he says are to blame for his unsuccessful love life. He wishes he were of taller stature ("like 6'9") and a basketball player ("a baller"). He wishes for a better car, specifically a '64 Impala, instead of his 1974 Ford Pinto with "an 8-Track and a spare tire in the backseat, but that's flat!" The lyrics also mention the Los Angeles neighborhood of Crenshaw, and a signpost featuring the street name appears in the background of the music video. Additionally, the song references Buffalo Springfield's "For What It's Worth" in the lyrics "Hey, you, what's that sound?/ Everybody look what's going down".

Critical reception
Gil Robertson IV from Cash Box stated that Scotti Brothers has got a huge hit on its hands with this "good-natured, whimsical track" from the Southern California rapper. He added, "This track moves throughout with an intoxicating bass beat and smooth driving California flavor adds to its mix. Having already received a ton of urban radio adds and with a video that’s just been added to the rotation on MTV, this single shows strong potential to succeed on the R&B and pop charts as well." James Masterton for Dotmusic said, "Even at Christmas dance and rap hits can still have an impact. The brilliant pop hip-hop of Skee-Lo comes via persistent plugging from Radio One and a certain degreee of dancefloor popularity." Ross Jones from The Guardian wrote, "Over a snake-hipped R&B groove, the boy's light-hearted delivery and humble subject matter invite favourable comparisons with both The Pharcyde and Souls Of Mischief." 

Philippine newspaper Manila Standard called it "a true rarity — a rap song that dares to express vulnerable sentiments while retaining a funky edge". A reviewer from Music Week rated it four out of five, noting, "A low-down, funky, rolling vibe from the LA-based rapper. Old-school funk fused with jazzy tinges do justice to a tune which deserves to cause waves, and not just in the hip hop fraternity." Will Ashon from Muzik described it as "a ludicrous, dayglo, superfly wish-list from the self-depreciating and immediately likeable Skee-Lo". James Hunter from Vibe commented, "Dreaming of girls, cars, and height, his 'I Wish' is a most excellent pop-rap hit. Prom-night celebrity, that's his aspiration, and nobody's articulated it better in years. Skee-Lo wins because he doesn't try to sound like anything he's not".

Music video
A music video was produced to promote the single, directed by Marty Thomas. The music video was released for the week ending on May 14, 1995. It was nominated for three Billboard Music Video Awards: "Best Rap Clip", "Best Rap New Artist Music Video" and "Maximum Vision Clip of the Year".

The video begins with Skee-Lo sitting on a bench like Forrest Gump. It includes scenes reenacting the story of the lyrics, such as driving around in his beat-up old car, and being picked on during a game of basketball. The video was later published on YouTube in April 2013. The video has amassed more than 30.6 million views as of September 2022.

Track listing

Charts and certifications

Weekly charts

Year-end charts

Certifications

In other media
 The Secret Handshake did a cover of this song on Punk Goes Crunk.
 In As Heard on Radio Soulwax Pt. 2, 2manydjs superimposed the vocals of "I Wish" over Survivor's "Eye of the Tiger", then The Breeders' "Cannonball".
 Far East Movement did a cover of this song for the 2008 film Ping Pong Playa.
 "I Wish" is also featured as one of the lyrical tracks from Girl Talk's album All Day, on the track "Jump on Stage".
 Rapper MC Lars parodied the chorus of this song on his 2007 track "White Kids Aren't Hyphy".
 Skee-Lo appeared with Cher Lloyd on Late Night with Jimmy Fallon in November 2013, performing portions of "I Wish" along with her single "I Wish".
 Kevin Hart and Ice Cube released a remix of this song with NBA players Carmelo Anthony, Chris Paul, Andre Iguodala and Kobe Bryant appearing in the video to advertise Hart and Cube's movie Ride Along. It appeared on the NBA on ESPN and ABC during their Christmas Day coverage.
 Jimmy Fallon and Justin Timberlake did a cover of this song in the History of Rap 5 on Late Night with Jimmy Fallon.
 The song was featured on an episode "All I Want for Christmas is You" of Hindsight.
 The song was featured in The Simpsons episode "22 for 30".
 The song was featured in Lizzie McGuire, Season 2, Episode 25, "A Gordo Story".
 The song was featured in the trailer for the 2019 film Honey Boy starring Shia LaBeouf.
 The song was featured in Fresh Off the Boat, Season 5, Episode 20, "Nerd Watching".
 The song was featured during the credits of Season 1 Episode 4 of Santa Clarita Diet.
 The song was featured in It's Always Sunny In Philadelphia in the season 2 episode "Dennis and Dee Go on Welfare".

References

External links
 
 "Skee-Lo - I Wish Lyrics" (Fixed version)

1995 songs
Skee-Lo songs
1995 debut singles
Songs about Los Angeles
Songs written by Anne Dudley
Songs written by Trevor Horn
Scotti Brothers Records singles